Lolita Volodymyrivna Ananasova (born 9 July 1992 in Kharkiv) is a Ukrainian synchro-swimmer.

Career
Ananasova won the three bronze medals at the 2010 European Aquatics Championships.

She finished sixth at the solo free routine at the 2009 World Aquatics Championships and sixth in the free routine combination.

References

1992 births
Living people
Ukrainian synchronized swimmers
Olympic synchronized swimmers of Ukraine
Synchronized swimmers at the 2016 Summer Olympics
World Aquatics Championships medalists in synchronised swimming
Synchronized swimmers at the 2009 World Aquatics Championships
Synchronized swimmers at the 2011 World Aquatics Championships
Synchronized swimmers at the 2013 World Aquatics Championships
Synchronized swimmers at the 2015 World Aquatics Championships
European Aquatics Championships medalists in synchronised swimming
Sportspeople from Kharkiv
21st-century Ukrainian women